is a Japanese manga artist. His most notable works are One Outs and Liar Game.

Shinobu is from Kagoshima City, Kagoshima Prefecture. He graduated from Kagoshima Prefectural Konan High School and from Department of Electronics Engineering, Faculty of Engineering, Kagoshima University. He received the 2nd Prize of the 42nd Tezuka Award in 1991 and made his debut as a professional manga artist in 1993.

Works
Midoriyama Police Gang (1994, 2 volumes)
Sommelier (1996–1999, 9 volumes)
One Outs (1998–2006, 20 volumes)
Liar Game (2005–2015, 19 volumes)
Reinōryokusha Odagiri Kyōko no Uso (2007–2011, 7 volumes)
Liar Game - Roots of A (2008, 1 volume)
Winners Circle e Yōkoso (2011–2016, 9 volumes)
Muteki no Hito (2015–2016, 4 volumes)
Shin Shinchō Kōki (2019–2021, 8 volumes)
Kamo no Negi ni wa Doku ga Aru -Kamo Kyōju no "Ningen" Keizagaku Kōgi- (2022–present, with Takeshi Natsuhara)

References

External links 
 
 

1967 births
Living people
Kagoshima University alumni
People from Kagoshima
Manga artists from Kagoshima Prefecture